High Voltage is a 2018 American science fiction horror film written and directed by Alex Keledjian and starring David Arquette, Allie Gonino, Ryan Donowho, Perrey Reeves and Luke Wilson. The film was also known as Hollow Body.

Cast
David Arquette as Jimmy
Allie Gonino as Rachel
Ryan Donowho as Scott
Erik Stocklin as Zach
Elizabeth Rice as Carrie
Bekka Walker as Chloe
Perrey Reeves as Barb
Luke Wilson as Rick

Reception
The film has  rating on Rotten Tomatoes.

References

External links
 
 

American science fiction horror films
2010s science fiction horror films
2010s English-language films
2010s American films